The Pano is a 57-storey riverside condominium located in Bangkok. 
It is the thirteenth tallest building and fourth tallest residential building in Thailand.

The Pano has a height of 219 metres and 57 floors. It contains 397 condominium units and is composed of two wings, the Sky Wing (high-rise) and the River Wing (low-rise).

The Pano placed fourth on the 2010 Emporis Skyscraper Award, an award for architectural excellence regarding the design of buildings and their functionality.
WOHA, the architectural firm, won the Singapore President's Design Award.

See also
List of tallest buildings in Thailand

References

External links
the pano bangkok condominium
 thepano.com
 The Pano at emporis.com

Skyscrapers in Bangkok
Residential buildings completed in 2010
2010 establishments in Thailand
Residential skyscrapers in Thailand
WOHA